Jonestown is an album by Canadian hip hop artist D-Sisive. Released in 2009, the album was D-Sisive's second full-length release that year after Let the Children Die, and was made available for a free digital download. The album art features a jug of Kool-Aid, an allusion to the phrase "drinking the Kool-Aid", which is associated with the 1978 Jonestown mass murder–suicide.

Critical reception
Chris Dart of Exclaim! reviewed the album positively, calling it "alternately head-nodding, creepy and darkly humorous", and writing that it "marks a high point for [D-Sisive], and is hopefully a sign of even bigger things to come."

Track listing

References

External links
 Jonestown by D-Sisive on Bandcamp

2009 albums
D-Sisive albums
Cultural depictions of Jim Jones